Volodymyr Pianykh (5 February 1951) is an association footballer from the former Soviet Union who played for FC Shakhtar Donetsk. After retiring as a player, Pianykh became a football referee.

In 1979 Pianykh played couple of games for Ukraine at the Spartakiad of the Peoples of the USSR.

Pianykh was a referee at the 1994 FIFA World Cup qualification match between Finland and Israel that took place on 16 June 1993 in Lahti, Finland.

References

External links
 Volodymyr Pianykh at the footballfacts.ru
 Volodymyr Pianykh at the allplayers.in.ua

1951 births
Living people
Footballers from Donetsk
Sportspeople from Donetsk
Soviet footballers
Soviet football referees
Ukrainian football referees
FC Shakhtar Donetsk players
FC Shakhtar Stakhanov players
SKA Kiev players
FC Shakhtar Horlivka players
Association football defenders